Hougang Central Bus Interchange is a bus interchange serving the town of Hougang. It is located directly above Hougang MRT station. This bus interchange was planned to be an integrated transport hub.

History
Plans to build a bus interchange in Hougang North were first announced in Parliament in January 1992. Intended to connect Hougang with adjacent new towns and the Central Area, the bus interchange was built in response to requests made by the Member of Parliament for the area to improve bus services. Having cost  to build, Hougang Central Bus Interchange was subsequently opened by Minister of State (Trade and Industry and Communications) Goh Chee Wee on 18 December 1994.

From 1998 to 2001, the interchange was closed to facilitate the construction of Hougang MRT station, and six bus services were diverted to a temporary bus interchange along Upper Serangoon Road. In February 2004, bus operations at the Hougang South bus interchange were shifted to this interchange.

By 2030, Hougang Central Bus Interchange would be majorly renovated to accommodate the Cross Island line section, and would become an Integrated Transport Hub in 2030.

Bus Contracting Model
Under the new bus contracting model, with the exception of services 74 and 147 under Clementi, the rest of the services are under Sengkang-Hougang Bus Packages.

References

External links
 Interchanges and Terminals (SBS Transit)

Bus stations in Singapore
Buildings and structures in Hougang
Transport in North-East Region, Singapore